City of Liverpool or Liverpool City may refer to:


Places
Liverpool, a city in Merseyside, United Kingdom formerly in Lancashire
Liverpool, New South Wales, a suburb of Sydney, Australia

Politics
City of Liverpool (New South Wales), a local government area in Sydney, Australia, including the suburb
Liverpool City Council, the governing body for the city of Liverpool, England

Sports
 Liverpool City (1906), a defunct rugby league team based in Liverpool that played from 1906 to 1907
 Liverpool City RLFC, defunct rugby team playing from 1951 to 1968, previously known as Liverpool Stanley and renamed Huyton RLFC
 City of Liverpool (water polo), British water polo club, see Team GB women's water polo team
 City of Liverpool F.C., an association football club founded in 2015

Other
City of Liverpool (aircraft), the aircraft downed in the 1933 Imperial Airways Diksmuide crash